Stephen Parsons may refer to:

Stephen W. Parsons, British musician, composer, songwriter and music producer, also known as Steve Parsons, Stephen Parsons, Snips, Mr. Snips, SWP
Stephen Parsons (Australian footballer)
Steve Parsons (English footballer), also known as Stephen Paul James Parsons

See also
Stephen Parsons House, historic house in Maine, USA